Edmond Enoka (born December 17, 1955 in Douala) is a retired Cameroonian professional football defender. He was an unused reserve for the Cameroon national football team at the 1982 FIFA World Cup and the 1984 African Cup of Nations finals.

Career 
Enoka played club football for Union Douala, Caïman Douala, Dynamo Douala, and Canon Yaoundé.

Enoka made several appearances for the Cameroon national football team, including playing in the group stage of the 1982 African Cup of Nations finals and a friendly against Saudi Arabia on 4 October 1985.

References

External links 
 
  

1955 births
Living people
Footballers from Douala
Cameroonian footballers
Cameroon international footballers
1982 FIFA World Cup players
1982 African Cup of Nations players
1984 African Cup of Nations players
1986 African Cup of Nations players
Africa Cup of Nations-winning players
Union Douala players
Canon Yaoundé players
Association football defenders